VA-125 may refer to:
VA-125 (U.S. Navy)
Second VA-125 (U.S. Navy)
Virginia State Route 125

See also
 VFA-125, U.S. Navy